Reginald George de Vere Capell, 9th Earl of Essex T.D. (9 October 1906 – 18 May 1981) was a British peer.

Early life
He was the son of Algernon George de Vere Capell, 8th Earl of Essex, and Mary Eveline Stewart Freeman. He had the courtesy title Viscount Malden, and was known as Reggie Malden.

He was educated at St Cyprian's School in Eastbourne, Eton and Magdalene College, Cambridge.

Career
He served in the army during World War II and was awarded the T.D. After the war he began farming in Buckinghamshire. He retained his military connections and became Lieutenant-Colonel in 1947 and was commanding officer of the 16th Airborne Division Signals Regiment (Middlesex Yeomanry) (Territorial Army) in 1948.  He became Honorary Colonel of the 16th (later 40th) Signal Regiment in 1957 and its successor, the  47th (Middlesex Yeomanry) Signal Regiment, in 1962.

House of Lords
Capell inherited the Earldom of Essex on the death of his father in 1966 and took his seat in the House of Lords. In his maiden speech in 1971, he opposed the recommendation of the Roskill Commission for the siting of a third London airport at Cublington. The third airport was eventually provided by the development of Stansted Airport.

Personal life
Capell married, firstly, Mary Reeve Ward, daughter of F. Gibson Ward, on 2 March 1937. They were divorced in 1957. His second wife was Nona Isabel Miller (1906–1997), daughter of David Wilson Miller and widow of Francis Sydney Smythe of Yew tree cottage in November 1957. He had no children by either marriage.  In 1967, Debrett's had identified Bladen Horace Capell, "a grocery clerk in Yuba City, California" as the person eligible to become the Earl of Essex, if no other heirs could be identified.

On his death in 1981, the title became dormant, but it was revived eight years later by a distant cousin, Robert Capell.

References

External links

Reginald George de Vere Capell, 9th Earl of Essex (1906-1981), Army officer at the National Portrait Gallery, London

1906 births
1981 deaths
20th-century British people
Alumni of Magdalene College, Cambridge
People educated at Eton College
People educated at St Cyprian's School
Middlesex Yeomanry officers
Royal Corps of Signals officers
British Army personnel of World War II
English cricketers
Bedfordshire cricketers
Reginald
Reginald